St. Catharine, also known as Dr. Samuel A. Mudd House, is a historic house near Waldorf, Maryland. It is a two-part frame farmhouse with a two-story, three-bay side-passage main house with a smaller two-story, two-bay wing. It features a one-story hip-roofed porch across the facade added in 1928. It was at this house where Dr. Samuel A. Mudd treated the injured John Wilkes Booth, who was fleeing justice a day after assassinating President Abraham Lincoln on April 14, 1865, following the defeat of the Confederacy in the American Civil War. 

"St. Catharine" has been in the Mudd family since the 1690s.  In 1974, St. Catharine was listed on the National Register of Historic Places.  Currently, it is operated as a historic house museum.

References

External links

museum website
 including photo from 1990, at Maryland Historical Trust

Houses in Charles County, Maryland
Houses on the National Register of Historic Places in Maryland
Historic house museums in Maryland
Houses completed in 1865
Museums in Charles County, Maryland
Waldorf, Maryland
National Register of Historic Places in Charles County, Maryland
1865 establishments in Maryland